Dauntsey railway station served the village of Dauntsey, Wiltshire from 1869 to 1965. It was situated on the Great Western Main Line which runs from London to Bristol.

The station site is a mile and a half south of Dauntsey village and is near Dauntsey Lock which suggests that the station was important to the Wilts & Berks Canal. The station had a main building with a canopy on the up platform (towards London) and the platform on the opposite side had a small brick shelter, also with a canopy.

Dauntsey station became the junction for the branch line to Malmesbury in 1877. The up platform was extended west of the road bridge with a bay platform to accommodate trains on the branch line.
When the GWR built the South Wales Main Line in 1903 it passed a few miles north of Dauntsey.  In 1933 the connection between the Malmesbury branch and the main line was moved to Little Somerford on the newer main line, and the redundant section between Dauntsey and Somerford became a siding.
The canopy used for the branch line platform was moved to Yatton station where it can still be seen today.

Most of Dauntsey station was demolished in 1977 although the station house and the up platform remain.

References 

 Wiltshire Railway Stations, 2004, Mike Oakley,

External links
 Dauntsey station on navigable 1948 O. S. map
 Dauntsey station on Google maps

Buildings and structures demolished in 1977
Disused railway stations in Wiltshire
Railway stations in Great Britain opened in 1868
Railway stations in Great Britain closed in 1965
Beeching closures in England
Former Great Western Railway stations